The 2026 World Baseball Classic is an upcoming international professional baseball tournament, planned to be the sixth iteration of the World Baseball Classic (WBC). Most of the information regarding the tournament is still yet to be determined, including tournament format, dates, and venues.

Teams

Qualification
16 teams qualified for the 2026 tournament by being in the top four of their pool in the 2023 tournament. Other participants will be determined through the qualifying tournament.

References

External links
Official website

World Baseball Classic
World Baseball Classic